Defending champions Coco Gauff and Jessica Pegula defeated Lyudmyla Kichenok and Jeļena Ostapenko in the final, 6–4, 2–6, [10–7] to win the doubles tennis title at the 2023 WTA Qatar Open.

Seeds

Draw

Draw

References

External links
Main draw

Qatar Doubles
2023 in Qatari sport